Alfred Renfrew Richards (14 December 1867 – 9 January 1904) was a South African sportsman who represented his country at Test cricket and rugby union. Born in Grahamstown, Cape Colony, and educated at The Leys School in Cambridge, Richards was capped three times for South Africa in rugby, including captaining them once, and made one Test cricket appearance, also as captain.

Cricket career
Richards played for Western Province in some of the earliest provincial matches in South Africa, and in 1893–94, his 108 was the highest score as his team beat Natal to win the Currie Cup.

His next first-class match came when he captained Western Province against the touring Lord Hawke's XI in 1895–96, when his 58, scored out of a total of 122, won him selection for the third Test match of the series, which followed a few days later. Richards captained the Test side, but scored only 6 and 0 as South Africa lost by an innings and 33 runs. He never played first-class cricket again.

Rugby career
Richards made his international rugby debut for South Africa in 1891, the year that the British Isles rugby team came to South Africa for the very first time. He made his debut on 30 July in Port Elizabeth. South Africa were outscored three tries to nil, and Great Britain won the match 4 points to nil. He was capped again on 29 August in Kimberley, which Great Britain also won, 3 to nil.

On 5 September, he was chosen as the captain to lead South Africa out against Great Britain once again, in Cape Town at Newlands. The tourists also won the match, four points to nil. Richards did not play for South Africa again after the tour. Richards did however referee one match in 1896, when Britain returned, at Newlands, which South Africa won five points to nil.

Test history

Personal
Richards' older brothers, Dicky and Joseph, also played cricket for Western Province and Dicky appeared in one Test match in 1888–89.

He died at Salisbury, Rhodesia, of typhoid fever, in January 1904, aged 36.

See also
List of footballers (rugby union) by country
South African rugby union captains
List of South Africa national rugby union players – Springbok no. 6

References

External links
Alf Richards on the Springbok Rugby Hall of Fame
Referee data

1867 births
1904 deaths
People educated at The Leys School
South Africa Test cricketers
South African cricketers
South African rugby union players
South African rugby union referees
South Africa international rugby union players
South African people of British descent
Western Province cricketers
People from Makhanda, Eastern Cape
South Africa Test cricket captains
Villager FC players
Western Province (rugby union) players
Rugby union centres
Rugby union fly-halves
Rugby union players from the Eastern Cape